The heritability of autism is the proportion of differences in expression of autism that can be explained by genetic variation; if the heritability of a condition is high, then the condition is considered to be primarily genetic. Autism has a strong genetic basis, although the genetics of autism are complex and it is unclear whether autism spectrum disorder (ASD) is explained more by multigene interactions or by rare mutations with major effects.

Early studies of twins estimated the heritability of autism to be more than 90%; in other words, that 90% of the differences between autistic and non-autistic individuals are due to genetic effects. This however may be an overestimate: new twin data and models with structural genetic variation are needed. When only one identical twin is autistic, the other often has learning or social disabilities. For adult siblings, the likelihood of having one or more features of the broader autism phenotype might be as high as 30%, much higher than the likelihood in controls.

Genetic linkage analysis has been inconclusive; many association analyses have had inadequate power. For each autistic individual, mutations in more than one gene may be implicated. Mutations in different sets of genes may be involved in different autistic individuals. There may be significant interactions among mutations in several genes, or between the environment and mutated genes. By identifying genetic markers inherited with autism in family studies, numerous candidate genes have been located, most of which encode proteins involved in neural development and function. However, for most of the candidate genes, the actual mutations that increase the likelihood for autism have not been identified. Typically, autism cannot be traced to a Mendelian (single-gene) mutation or to single chromosome abnormalities such as fragile X syndrome or 22q13 deletion syndrome.

The large number of autistic individuals with unaffected family members may result from copy number variations (CNVs)—spontaneous alterations in the genetic material during meiosis that delete or duplicate genetic material. Sporadic (non-inherited) cases have been examined to identify candidate genetic loci involved in autism. A substantial fraction of autism may be highly heritable but not inherited: that is, the mutation that causes the autism is not present in the parental genome.

Although the fraction of autism traceable to a genetic cause may grow to 30–40% as the resolution of array CGH improves, several results in this area have been described incautiously, possibly misleading the public into thinking that a large proportion of autism is caused by CNVs and is detectable via array CGH, or that detecting CNVs is tantamount to a genetic diagnosis. The Autism Genome Project database contains genetic linkage and CNV data that connect autism to genetic loci and suggest that every human chromosome may be involved. It may be that using autism-related subphenotypes instead of the diagnosis of autism per se may be more useful in identifying susceptible loci.

Twin studies 
Twin studies are a helpful tool in determining the heritability of disorders and human traits in general. They involve determining concordance of characteristics between identical (monozygotic or MZ) twins and between fraternal (dizygotic or DZ) twins. Possible problems of twin studies are: (1) errors in diagnosis of monozygocity, and (2) the assumption that social environment sharing by DZ twins is equivalent to that of MZ twins.

A condition that is environmentally caused without genetic involvement would yield a concordance for MZ twins equal to the concordance found for DZ twins.  In contrast, a condition that is completely genetic in origin would theoretically yield a concordance of 100% for MZ pairs and usually much less for DZ pairs depending on factors such as the number of genes involved and assortative mating.

An example of a condition that appears to have very little if any genetic influence is irritable bowel syndrome (IBS), with a concordance of 28% vs. 27% for MZ and DZ pairs respectively. An
example of a human characteristics that is extremely heritable is eye color, with a concordance of 98% for MZ pairs and 7–49% for DZ pairs depending on age.

Identical twin studies put autism's heritability in a range between 36% and 95.7%, with concordance for a broader phenotype usually found at the higher end of the range. Autism concordance in siblings and fraternal twins is anywhere between 0 and 23.5%. This is more likely 2–4% for classic autism and 10–20% for a broader spectrum. Assuming a general-population prevalence of 0.1%, the risk of classic autism in siblings is 20- to 40-fold that of the general population.

Notable twin studies have attempted to shed light on the heritability of autism.

A small scale study in 1977 was the first of its kind to look into the heritability of autism. It involved 10 DZ twins and 11 MZ twins in which at least one twin in each pair showed infantile autism. It found a concordance of 36% in MZ twins compared to 0% for DZ twins. Concordance of "cognitive abnormalities" was 82% in MZ pairs and 10% for DZ pairs. In 12 of the 17 pairs discordant for autism, a biological hazard was believed to be associated with the condition.

A 1979 case report discussed a pair of identical twins concordant for autism. The twins developed similarly until the age of 4, when one of them spontaneously improved. The other twin, who had had infrequent seizures, remained autistic. The report noted that genetic factors were not "all important" in the development of twins.

In 1985, a study of twins enrolled with the UCLA Registry for Genetic Studies found a concordance of 95.7% for autism in 23 pairs of MZ twins, and 23.5% for 17 DZ twins.

In a 1989 study, Nordic countries were screened for cases of autism. Eleven pairs of MZ twins and 10 of DZ twins were examined. Concordance of autism was found to be 91% in MZ and 0% in DZ pairs. The concordances for "cognitive disorder" were 91% and 30% respectively. In most of the pairs discordant for autism, the autistic twin had more perinatal stress.

A British twin sample was reexamined in 1995 and a 60% concordance was found for autism in MZ twins vs. 0% concordance for DZ. It also found 92% concordance for a broader spectrum in MZ vs. 10% for DZ. The study concluded that "obstetric hazards usually appear to be consequences of genetically influenced abnormal development, rather than independent aetiological factors."

A 1999 study looked at social cognitive skills in the general-population of children and adolescents. It found "poorer social cognition in males", and a heritability of 0.68 with higher genetic influence in younger twins.

In 2000, a study looked at reciprocal social behavior in general-population identical twins. It found a concordance of 73% for MZ, i.e. "highly heritable", and 37% for DZ pairs.

A 2004 study looked at 16 MZ twins and found a concordance of 43.75% for "strictly defined autism". Neuroanatomical differences (discordant cerebellar white and grey matter volumes) between discordant twins were found.  The abstract notes that in previous studies 75% of the non-autistic twins displayed the broader phenotype.

Another 2004 study examined whether the characteristic symptoms of autism (impaired social interaction, communication deficits, and repetitive behaviors) show decreased variance of symptoms among monozygotic twins compared to siblings in a sample of 16 families. The study demonstrated significant aggregation of symptoms in twins. It also concluded that "the levels of clinical features seen in autism may be a result of mainly independent genetic traits."

An English twin study in 2006 found high heritability for autistic traits in a large group of 3,400 pairs of twins.

One critic of the pre-2006 twin studies said that they were too small and their results can be plausibly explained on non-genetic grounds.

Sibling studies 
A study of 99 autistic probands which found a 2.9% concordance for autism in siblings, and between 12.4% and 20.4% concordance for a "lesser variant" of autism.

A study of 31 siblings of autistic children, 32 siblings of children with developmental delay, and 32 controls. It found that the siblings of autistic children, as a group, "showed superior spatial and verbal span, but a greater than expected number performed poorly on the set-shifting, planning, and verbal fluency tasks."

A 2005 Danish study looked at "data from the Danish Psychiatric Central Register and the Danish Civil Registration System to study some risk factors of autism, including place of birth, parental place of birth, parental age, family history of psychiatric disorders, and paternal identity."  It found an overall prevalence rate of roughly 0.08%. Prevalence of autism in siblings of autistic children was found to be 1.76%. Prevalence of autism among siblings of children with Asperger syndrome or PDD was found to be 1.04%. The risk was twice as high if the mother had been diagnosed with a psychiatric disorder. The study also found that "the risk of autism was associated with increasing degree of urbanisation of the child's place of birth and with increasing paternal, but not maternal, age."

A study in 2007 looked at a database containing pedigrees of 86 families with two or more autistic children and found that 42 of the third-born male children showed autistic symptoms, suggesting that parents had a 50% chance of passing on a mutation to their offspring. The mathematical models suggest that about 50% of autistic cases are caused by spontaneous mutations. The simplest model was to divide parents into two risk classes depending on whether the parent carries a pre-existing mutation that causes autism; it suggested that about a quarter of autistic children have inherited a copy number variation from their parents.

Other family studies 
A 1994 study looked at the personalities of parents of autistic children, using parents of children with Down syndrome as controls. Using standardized tests it was found that parents of autistic children were "more aloof, untactful and unresponsive" compared to parents whose children did not have autism.

A 1997 study found higher rates of social and communication deficits and stereotyped behaviors in families with multiple-incidence autism.

Autism was found to occur more often in families of physicists, engineers and scientists. 12.5% of the fathers and 21.2% of the grandfathers (both paternal and maternal) of children with autism were engineers, compared to 5% of the fathers and 2.5% of the grandfathers of children with other syndromes.  Other studies have yielded similar results. Findings of this nature have led to the coinage of the term "geek syndrome".

A 2001 study of brothers and parents of autistic boys looked into the phenotype in terms of one current cognitive theory of autism. The study raised the possibility that the broader autism phenotype may include a "cognitive style" (weak central coherence) that can confer information-processing advantages.

A study in 2005 showed a positive correlation between repetitive behaviors in autistic individuals and obsessive-compulsive behaviors in parents.  Another 2005 study focused on sub-threshold autistic traits in the general population. It found that correlation for social impairment or competence between parents and their children and between spouses is about 0.4.

A 2005 report examined the family psychiatric history of 58 subjects with Asperger syndrome (AS) diagnosed according to DSM-IV criteria. Three (5%) had first-degree relatives with AS. Nine (19%) had a family history of schizophrenia.  Thirty five (60%) had a family history of depression. Out of 64 siblings, 4 (6.25%) were diagnosed with AS.
According to a 2022 study held on  86 mother-child dyads across 18 months, "prior maternal depression didn’t predict child behavior problems later."

Twinning risk 

It has been suggested that the twinning process itself is a risk factor
in the development of autism, presumably due to perinatal factors.  However, three large-scale epidemiological studies have refuted this idea. These studies took place in California, Sweden, and Australia. One study done in Western Australia, utilized the Maternal and Child Health Research Database that houses birth records for all infants born, including infants and later children diagnosed with autism spectrum disorder. During this study, the population analyzed for the incidence of Autism Spectrum Disorder was restricted to those children with birth years between 1980 and 1995. The focus was on the incidence of autism spectrum disorder in the twin population in comparison to the non twin population. The following two studies, explored the risk of Autism spectrum disorder in the twin population. The conclusion that the twinning process alone is not a risk factor was drawn. In these studies the data exemplified that both MZ twins will have autism spectrum disorder, but only one of the DZ twins will have autism spectrum disorder with an incidence rate of 90% in MZ twins compared to 0% in DZ twins. The high symmetry in MZ twins can explain the high symmetry of autism spectrum disorder in MZ twins outcome compared to DZ twins and non twin siblings.

Proposed models 

Twin and family studies show that autism is a highly heritable condition, but they have left many questions for researchers, most notably
 Why is fraternal twin concordance so low considering that identical twin concordance is high?
 Why are parents of autistic children typically non-autistic?
 Which factors could be involved in the failure to find a 100% concordance in identical twins?
 Is profound intellectual disability a characteristic of the genotype or something totally independent?

Clues to the first two questions come from studies that have shown that at least 30% of individuals with autism have spontaneous de novo mutations that occurred in the father's sperm or mother's egg that disrupt important genes for brain development. These spontaneous mutations are likely to cause autism in families where there is no family history of the disorder. The concordance between identical twins isn't quite 100% for two reasons, because these mutations have variable 'expressivity' and their effects manifest differently due to chance effects, epigenetic, and environmental factors. Also spontaneous mutations can potentially occur specifically in one embryo and not the other after conception. The likelihood of developing intellectual disability is dependent on the importance of the gene to brain development and how the mutation changes this function, also playing a role is the genetic and environmental background upon which a mutation occurs.
The recurrence of the same mutations in multiple individuals affected by autism has led Brandler and Sebat to suggest that the spectrum of autism is breaking up into quanta of many different genetic disorders.

Single genes 

The most parsimonious explanation for cases of autism where a single child is affected and there is no family history or affected siblings is that a single spontaneous mutation that impacts one or multiple genes is a significant contributing factor. Tens of individual genes or mutations have been definitively identified and are cataloged by the Simons Foundation Autism Research Initiative.
Examples of autism that has arisen from a rare or de novo mutation in a single-gene or locus include the neurodevelopmental disorders fragile X syndrome, 22q13 deletion syndrome, and 16p11.2 deletion syndrome.

These mutations themselves are characterized by considerable variability in clinical outcome and typically only a subset of mutation carriers meet criteria for autism. For example, carriers of the 16p11.2 deletion have a mean IQ 32 points lower than their first-degree relatives that do not carry the deletion, however only 20% are below the threshold IQ of 70 for intellectual disability, and only 20% have autism. Around 85% have a neurobehavioral diagnosis, including autism, ADHD, anxiety disorders, mood disorders, gross motor delay, and epilepsy, while 15% have no diagnosis. Alongside these neurobehavioral phenotypes, the 16p11.2 deletions / duplications have been associated with macrocephaly / microcephaly, body weight regulation, and the duplication in particular is associated with schizophrenia. Controls that carry mutations associated with autism or schizophrenia typically present with intermediate cognitive phenotypes or fecundity compared to neurodevelopmental cases and population controls. Therefore, a single mutation can have multiple different effects depending on other genetic and environmental factors.

Multigene interactions 

In this model, autism often arises from a combination of common, functional variants of genes. Each gene contributes a relatively small effect in increasing the risk of autism. In this model, no single gene directly regulates any core symptom of autism such as social behavior. Instead, each gene encodes a protein that disrupts a cellular process, and the combination of these disruptions, possibly together with environmental influences, affect key developmental processes such as synapse formation. For example, one model is that many mutations affect MET and other receptor tyrosine kinases, which in turn converge on disruption of ERK and PI3K signaling.

Two family types 
In this model most families fall into two types: in the majority, sons have a low risk of autism, but in a small minority their risk is near 50%. In the low-risk families, sporadic autism is mainly caused by spontaneous mutation with poor penetrance in daughters and high penetrance in sons. The high-risk families come from (mostly female) children who carry a new causative mutation but are unaffected and transmit the dominant mutation to grandchildren.

Epigenetic 

Several epigenetic models of autism have been proposed. These are suggested by the occurrence of autism in individuals with fragile X syndrome, which arises from epigenetic mutations, and with Rett syndrome, which involves epigenetic regulation factors. An epigenetic model would help explain why standard genetic screening strategies have so much difficulty with autism.

Genomic imprinting 
Genomic imprinting models have been proposed; one of their strengths is explaining the high male-to-female ratio in ASD. One hypothesis is that autism is in some sense diametrically opposite to schizophrenia and other psychotic-spectrum conditions, that alterations of genomic imprinting help to mediate the development of these two sets of conditions, and that ASD involves increased effects of paternally expressed genes, which regulate overgrowth in the brain, whereas schizophrenia involves maternally expressed genes and undergrowth.

Environmental interactions 
Though autism's genetic factors explain most of autism risk, they do not explain all of it. A common hypothesis is that autism is caused by the interaction of a genetic predisposition and an early environmental insult. Several theories based on environmental factors have been proposed to address the remaining risk. Some of these theories focus on prenatal environmental factors, such as agents that cause birth defects; others focus on the environment after birth, such as children's diets. All known teratogens (agents that cause birth defects) related to the risk of autism appear to act during the first eight weeks from conception, strong evidence that autism arises very early in development. Although evidence for other environmental causes is anecdotal and has not been confirmed by reliable studies, extensive searches are underway.

Sex bias 
Autism spectrum disorder affects all races, ethnicities, and socioeconomic groups. Still, more males than females are affected across all cultures, the ratios of males-to-females is appropriately 3 to 1. A study analyzed the Autism Genetics Resource Exchange (AGRE database), which holds resources, research, and records of autism spectrum disorder diagnosis. In this study, it was concluded that when a spontaneous mutation causes autism spectrum disorder (ASD), there is high penetrance in males and low penetrance in females. A study published in 2020 explored the reason behind this idea further. It is commonly known that the main difference between males and females is the fact that males have one X and one Y sex chromosome whereas female have two X chromosomes. This leads to the idea that there is a gene on the X chromosome that is not on the Y that is involved with the sex bias of ASD.

In another study, it has been found that the gene called NLGN4, when mutated, can cause ASD. This gene and other NLGN genes are important for neuron communications. This NLGN4 gene is found on both the X (NLGN4X) and the Y (NLGN4Y) chromosome. The sex chromosomes are 97% identical. It has been determined that most of the mutations that occur are located on the NLGN4X gene. Research into the differences between NLGN4X and NLGN4Y found that the NLGN4Y protein has poor surface expectations and poor synapses regulations, leading to poor neuron communication. Researchers concluded that males have a higher incidence of autism when the mechanism is NLGN4X-associated. This association was concluded since females have two X chromosomes; if there is a mutation in a gene on an X chromosome, the other X chromosome can be used to compensate for the mutation. Whereas males have only one X chromosome, meaning that if there is a mutation in a gene on an X chromosome, then that is the only copy of the gene and it will be used. The genomic difference between males and females is one mechanism that leads to the higher incidence of ASD in males.

Candidate gene loci 
Known genetic syndromes, mutations, and metabolic diseases account for up to 20% of autism cases. A number of alleles have been shown to have strong linkage to the autism phenotype. In many cases the findings are inconclusive, with some studies showing no linkage. Alleles linked so far strongly support the assertion that there is a large number of genotypes that are
manifested as the autism phenotype. At least some of the alleles associated with autism are fairly prevalent in the general population, which indicates they are not rare pathogenic mutations. This also presents some challenges in identifying all the rare allele combinations involved in the etiology of autism.

A 2008 study compared genes linked with autism to those of other neurological diseases, and found that more than half of known autism genes are implicated in other disorders, suggesting that the other disorders may share molecular mechanisms with autism.

Primary

Others 
There is a large number of other candidate loci which either should be looked at or have been shown to be promising. Several genome-wide scans have been performed identifying markers across many chromosomes.

A few examples of loci that have been studied are the 17q21 region, the 3p24-26 locus, PTEN, 15q11.2–q13 and deletion in the 22q11.2 area.

Homozygosity mapping in pedigrees with shared ancestry and autism incidence has recently implicated the following candidate genes: PCDH10, DIA1 (formerly known as C3ORF58), NHE9, CNTN3, SCN7A, and RNF8. Several of these genes appeared to be targets of MEF2, one of the transcription factors known to be regulated by neuronal activity and that itself has also recently been implicated as an autism-related disorder candidate gene.

References

Further reading 

  An excellent summary of the state and possible future directions of autism genetics research as of late 2007.
  Advocates common disease rare allele (CDRA) over polygenic approaches.
  Focuses on attempts to match genes to behavior.

External links 
 Autism Genetic Resource Exchange (AGRE) – 'the world's first collaborative gene bank for autism'

Genetics of autism
Medical genetics
Biological psychiatry
Behavioral neuroscience